Joseph M. Minard (January 5, 1932 – January 17, 2022) was an American politician from West Virginia. A Democrat, he was a member of the West Virginia Senate, representing the 12th district from 1990 until 1994, and again from 1998 until 2013. He was a Delegate in the West Virginia House of Delegates from his appointment in 1983 through 1990. Minard was also the President Pro Tempore of the West Virginia Senate. He died on January 17, 2022, at the age of 90.

References

External links
West Virginia Legislature – Senator Joseph M. Minard official government website
Project Vote Smart – Senator Joseph M. Minard (WV) profile
Follow the Money – Joseph M. Minard
2008 2006 2004 2002 1998 Senate campaign contributions

1932 births
2022 deaths
21st-century American politicians
Democratic Party West Virginia state senators
Democratic Party members of the West Virginia House of Delegates
Politicians from Clarksburg, West Virginia
Businesspeople from Clarksburg, West Virginia
Military personnel from Clarksburg, West Virginia
West Virginia University alumni